Gudåa or Gudå is a village in the municipality of Meråker in Trøndelag county, Norway. The village is served by Gudå Station on the Meråker Line railway as well as the European route E14 highway. Gudåa has a camping ground and it is a popular fishing spot for salmon.

References

Villages in Trøndelag
Meråker